The 1981 Jameson International was the first staging of the professional non-ranking snooker tournament that took place between 14 and 20 September 1981 at the Assembly Rooms in Derby, England. Television coverage was on ITV.

Earlier matches were played at the Romiley Forum in Stockport finishing on 12 September. Four of the last-16 matches were played there with the remaining four played in Derby.

Steve Davis won the tournament by defeating Dennis Taylor 9–0 in the final.

Main draw

References

Scottish Open (snooker)
Sport in Derby
International Open
International Open
International Open
1980s in Derby